was a village in Watarai District, Mie Prefecture, Japan.

As of 2003, the village had an estimated population of 1,543 and a density of 23.84 persons per km2. The total area was 64.73 km2.

On February 14, 2005, Ōuchiyama, along with the towns of Kisei and Ōmiya (all from Watarai District), was merged to create the town of Taiki and thus no longer exists as an independent municipality.

External links
 Official website of Taiki 

Dissolved municipalities of Mie Prefecture